Obscura is the third full-length album by Canadian death metal band Gorguts. The album was released on June 23, 1998 through the now-defunct Olympic Recordings, but has since been reissued by a number of labels, in particular Century Media in 2015. Since its release, Obscura has come to be regarded as one of the most important albums in the technical death metal genre, and as "one of the most complex and technical records in the genre, due to its unprecedented dissonance and experimentation brought by the band's late guitarist Steeve Hurdle."  Lyrically, the album represents a further departure from the band's established approach, touching on spiritual and existential themes. Luc Lemay has described the album as "the record that defined our sound."

History 
Following the release in 1993 of their second full-length The Erosion of Sanity, the band took part in a European tour with Blasphemy. The band's return coincided with the decline of death metal's popularity, and they were subsequently dropped from the Roadrunner roster. Following their departure from the label, they "started writing material for Obscura". Gorguts also lost both their drummer and guitarist, who simply left the band. They were replaced by 'Purulence' guitarist Steeve Hurdle and 'Psychic Throb' bassist Steve Cloutier.

The album was actually almost entirely written by the end of 1993, however it was delayed by a lack of label interest, and wasn't released until 1998. Writing began in April 1993 and was almost complete by late December of the same year. "We jammed these songs for four years without writing anything else in hopes that someone would call us or something. I remember I sent some tapes to record labels and they didn't even write back. They were not even interested. We didn't know it was ever going to come out."

Musical style 
Obscura represented a significant change in sound for the band, and has been described as moving towards "more complex and groundbreaking musical ideas." The album "is considered to be one of the most complex and technical records in the genre, due to its unprecedented dissonance and experimentation brought by the band's late guitarist Steeve Hurdle." The album makes use of complex song structures, unorthodox sounds, dissonant guitarwork, unconventional time signatures, and esoteric lyrical themes.

AllMusic's William York wrote that "The guitar/bass harmonies are extremely discordant, the guitar leads are full of alien harmonic squeals and other foreign noises (the title track, for example, features a recurring, legitimately atonal melody played via fingertapping), and the drums change tempos and time signatures in spastic, whiplash-inducing fashion." York also notes that despite the apparent chaos of the album's sound, "it possesses an underlying sense of logic and structure that does reveal itself upon repeat listens. A number of memorable, if strange, guitar melodies emerge throughout the album and help provide a sense of order and thematic unity amidst the apparent chaos; "Earthly Love" and "Nostalgia" are especially strong examples of this." Pitchfork's Hank Shteamer has described Obscura as "one of the most pungently progressive albums ever made, in or out of metal. Obscura didn't just register as technical; it sounded downright excruciating, as if its shuddering blastbeats, doleful bellows, and deliriously inventive guitarwork were being torn straight from the chests of its makers."

Critical reception and influence 
Obscura has come to be regarded as a pioneering album often described as being well ahead of its time, "one of the greatest albums ever made", and "a classic". It has also been noted as a significant influence on a range of other metal bands, including Ulcerate, Spawn of Possession, Brain Drill, and Obscura, who named their band after the album. William York of AllMusic categorized Obscura as "one of the most challenging, difficult albums ever released within the metal genre" and "a work of great depth and vision". Dean Brown of PopMatters remarked that "because of its influence, Obscura will always be a benchmark to which dissonant, technical death metal will be measured; and it's a release that time and circumstance has turned into an unbreakable marble altar."

Track listing

Personnel 
 Gorguts – producer
 Luc Lemay – guitar, artistic direction, vocals, viola, artwork
 Steeve Hurdle – guitar, vocals, concept idealisation, artistic direction, songs and album title
 Steve Cloutier – bass guitar
 Patrick Robert – drums
 Pierre Rémillard – producer, engineer
 Sylvain Brisebois – master
 Joel Beaupré – photography
 Alain Cloutier – artwork

References 

1998 albums
Gorguts albums
Concept albums